Barbara Sári (born 6 November 1990, in Győr) is a Hungarian handballer who plays for MTK Budapest as a line player. She is the daughter of former Hungarian international handballer and 1995 IHF World Player of the Year award winner Erzsébet Kocsis.

References

External links 
 Barbara Sári player profile on Dunaújvárosi NKS Official Website
 Barbara Sári career statistics on Worldhandball.com

1990 births
Living people
Sportspeople from Győr
Hungarian female handball players
Expatriate handball players
Hungarian expatriate sportspeople in Switzerland